Thomas Travis Medlock (born August 28, 1934) is an American politician and member of the Democratic Party from the state of South Carolina. He served as the 48th Attorney General of South Carolina from 1983 to 1995, in the South Carolina Senate from 1972 to 1976 and in the South Carolina House of Representatives from 1965 to 1972, representing Richland County, South Carolina. He ran for Governor of South Carolina in 1994 but lost in the Democratic primary. He is a lawyer in Columbia, South Carolina. He also wrote a book called Blood Red Spot.

References

1934 births
Living people
Democratic Party members of the South Carolina House of Representatives
Democratic Party South Carolina state senators
South Carolina lawyers
South Carolina Attorneys General
People from Lexington County, South Carolina